Statistics of Swiss Super League in the 1968–69 season.

Overview
There were 14 teams contesting in the 1968–69 Nationalliga A. These were the top 12 teams from the previous 1967–68 season and the two newly promoted teams Winterthur and St. Gallen. Basel finished the league season as champions one point ahead of Lausanne Sports in second position, who Basel defeated 4–0 in the second last match of the season, and six points clear of FC Zürich who finished third. Basel won 13 of the 26 games, drawing ten, losing three times, they scored 48 goals conceding 28. St. Gallen won the Swiss Cup and were thus qualified for the 1969–70 Cup Winners' Cup.

League standings

Results

References

Sources
Switzerland 1968–69 at RSSSF

Swiss Football League seasons
Swiss
1968–69 in Swiss football